Peter or Petrus Leopold Kaiser (3 November 1788, Mühlheim am Main - 30 December 1848, Mainz) was a German Roman Catholic clergyman. From 1834 until his death he served as Bishop of Mainz.

References

External links
https://de.wikisource.org/wiki/ADB:Kaiser,_Peter_Leopold

Bishops of Mainz (1802-present)
People from Mühlheim am Main
1788 births
1848 deaths
19th-century German Roman Catholic bishops